Jacqueline de Guillenchmidt born Jacqueline Barbara de Labelotterie de Boisséson September 25, 1943 in Beijing, China is a member of the Constitutional Council of France from 2004 to 2013.

Previously she was a member of Conseil supérieur de l'audiovisuel.

References

External links

1943 births
Living people
Politicians from Beijing
21st-century French politicians
Knights of the Ordre national du Mérite